Bangladesh–Syria relations refer to the bilateral relations between Bangladesh and Syria.

History
Syria was against interfering in Bangladesh Liberation war in 1971, describing it as an internal matter of Pakistan. Bangladesh exported jute products worth over 1 billion taka to Syrian per year between 2012 and 2013.

In 2015 to 2016 Bangladeshi women were trafficked to Syria where they were forced to work as sex workers and as slave labors. The women were promised jobs as maids in Lebanon. In 2016 the government of Bangladesh issued an advisory against travelling to Syria.

Syrian war
Bangladesh's foreign ministry condemned the use of chemical weapons "by any party under any circumstances" after a chemical attack in Syria on 2013. It has called for the conflict to be ended through "diplomatic and peaceful means". A few Bangladeshis have joined the Islamic State in Syria. A number of British-Bangladeshi including entire families have joined the Islamic State as well. Tamim Chowdhury, a Bangladeshi-Canadian who fought in Syria would become the head of the Islamic State unit in Bangladesh.

References

 
Syria
Bilateral relations of Syria